The Davis Madonna is a tempera on panel painting by Gentile da Fabriano, created c. 1410. It is held in the Metropolitan Museum of Art, in New York. The painting is named after Theodore M. Davis who acquired it in Florence, early in the 20th century before leaving it to its present owner in 1915.

Description
The painting is in a bad state of conservation, that is still improved nowadays, thanks to the restoration work. The Virgin Mary is seen seated on a slender throne pierced with arches and Gothic decorations, which is reminiscent of the Venetian tradition (both architectural and goldsmith's), from which dense foliage of shrubs sprout. She looks to the right, while the Child blesses on the left, suggesting that some side compartments were once also present.
It is a variant on the artist's Perugia Madonna, painted just before it. The 'plant throne' merges the iconography of the Maestà's throne with the Madonna of Humility sat on the earth, due also to the similarity between the Latin words "humus" (meadow) and "humiltas" (humility). At the base there are small musical angels and a scroll bearing the Regina caeli, an Easter antiphon that reads: "[R]egina c[o]eli l[a] eta re alleluia [quia] quem meruist [i] por tar[e a]ll[e]luya [r]esur [rexit] / sicut".

References

1410s paintings
Paintings in the collection of the Metropolitan Museum of Art
Paintings of the Madonna and Child by Gentile da Fabriano